The 2020–21 season is Mamelodi Sundowns's 50th season in existence and 25th consecutive season in the South African Premier Division, the top tier of South African soccer. They will also participate in the Nedbank Cup, the MTN 8 and the CAF Champions League.

First team squad
As of 22 November 2020

Transfers

Competitions

Overview

Premier Soccer League

League table

Results summary

Results by matchday

Matches

MTN 8

Nedbank Cup

Mamelodi Sundowns entired the competition in the Round of 32

CAF Champions League

Mamelodi Sundowns entered the competition in the first round

First round

The draw for the First Round was on 9 November 2020.

Group stage

The draw for the group stage was held on 8 January 2021

Matches

Statistics

Appearances
Players with no appearances not included in the list.

Goals

Assists

Clean Sheets

References

External links

PSL Club Info
South African Football Association
Confederation of African Football

Mamelodi Sundowns F.C. seasons
South African soccer clubs 2020–21 season
Mamelodi Sundowns